The DB Class V90 (after 1968 the DB Class 290) locomotive is a German road switcher diesel-hydraulic locomotive for shunting and freight hauling.

History and design

The DB Class V90 locomotives are similar to DB Class V 100 (Class 211 & 212) locomotives, they stemmed from a need for a heavy shunting locomotive - it was originally planned to create a heavy shunting variant of the V 100 (ballasted and with reinforced frame) to be produced, but this did not come to pass due to the design's stability problems.

Maschinenbau Kiel in co-operation with BZA München designed a longer and heavier locomotive, of a completely new design. In 1964, a pilot production of 20 of these were manufactured with a  engine as used in the DB Class V100.1 and a 70 km/h top speed.

In 1974 the first locomotive of the main production was produced - these locomotives had the  engine used in the DB Class V100.2 and a top speed of 80 km/h, the length of the locomotive was also extended to 14.32m; by 1974 408 had been built by MaK, Deutz, Henschel and Jung.
 
The machines have both a Dead-man's vigilance device (German:Sifa) and "Inductive train control system" (German:Indusi) (see Punktförmige Zugbeeinflussung) safety devices

Originally the locomotives were deep red (RAL 3004), in the mid-1970s a new ivory / ocean blue (RAL 5020 - RAL 1014) colour scheme was introduced, in the second half of the 1980s an eastern red (RAL 3031) color scheme was used and since the late'90s, the locomotives are found in the current traffic (RAL 3020) red of Deutsche Bahn AG. 

Since 2003, the locomotives have been upgraded with a new 1100-kW engine (type 8V 4000 R41 MTU) equipped, as well as other components being upgraded (specifically the hydraulic drive). The modernised locos save fuel despite having a higher rated engine. The serial number of the remotorised locomotives is increased by 500. (e.g. 290 030 becomes 290 530)

290 999 of the Bundeswehr
One locomotive of the class was procured by the Army for use in an Air Force supply regiment in Mechernich and given the locomotive code 290 999; on loan from the Deutsche Bundesbahn.

Since January 1996 the locomotive became the property of Deutsche Bahn AG and has been given the number 290 408. After this locomotives conversion to radio control it has been numbered 294 408

MaK V 90 P / DB Class 291
Before the main production began, MaK had produced of its own accord 5 locomotives of very similar type (but with a MaK engine) for assessment for export orders; they were tested in Sweden. The locomotives were called V 90 P The first two went to Dortmunder Eisenbahn.

The other 3 locomotives were leased by the Deutsche Bundesbahn for assessment - they had a requirement for heavy shunting locomotives in the ports of Hamburg, Emden and Bremen. These locomotives were classified as V 90 901 to V 90 903 (later as DB Class 291 901 onwards). In 1972 the locomotives were purchased, and in 1974 the main order of 100 further locomotives came - which were slightly lighter than the "P" locomotives. The majority were built at Kiel with ten of the hundred being built by Jung.

Instead of the V12 engine found in the Class 290 (class 212), the 291 class is equipped with a MaK 8-cylinder in-line engine that produces .

This type is only used for shunting (requiring high torque at low speed). The marine diesel engine is unsuitable for continuous use on the main line. The machines found use mainly in northern Germany.

Radio controlled versions

Two types of radio remote control have been utilised in order to make better use of these locomotives. 

Initially locomotives were equipped with radio equipment which allowed the Bergmeister (or Rückenmeister) (The yard hump controller) to control the locomotive. A driver still occupied the locomotive for safety reasons, and to control the locomotive. This method was used in large computer controlled marshalling yards such as Mannheim marshalling yard (German:Mannheim rbf), Seelze, Maschen, Munich, Kornwestheim Rbf and Nuremberg. 

Since Nuremberg Rbf has a downward gradient of the track (see Gravity Yard for an explanation), the locomotives are coupled with 6 axle flat wagon loaded with concrete weights that have been converted to brake tenders so that it is possible to stop trains of up to 2000 tons in weight.

Classes 294, 295
From 1995, large numbers of locomotives of the class were fitted a different type of radio remote produced by Krauss-Maffei (KM) 

The remote device is carried by remote train driver (German:Lokrangierführer LRF ) in a so-called "Belly Box" (see Remote control locomotive for details) and operated in a manner similar to that of a toy car or model aircraft remote control. 

This type of control is used in shunting operations and was previously used with smaller shunting locomotives such as the DB Class V 60 and DB Class Köf III (DB class 331 to 335)

The rebuilt locomotives of the 290 series form Class 294, rebuilt locomotives of the 291 series form Class 295

The locomotives have radio receiver in the cab, the LRF (remote train driver) must manually turn on the locomotive cab radio using a key switch on the locomotives control panel. A vehicle equipped with this type of remote control has a lamp above the cab window that lights to indicate that the locomotive is capable of receiving the radio signal. This means that the remote train driver (LRF) can now operate the locomotive at the trackside. 

Various functions can be activated remotely - brakes, start,  Vkonstant: i.e. running speed is automatically maintained, Sand, clutch etc.

Class 296
In 2007 locomotives of Class 290 which already had radio control for use in marshalling yards had the newer Krauss-Maffei remote fitted as well, allowing trackside control. These units were given the classification Class 296 and are found in the marshalling yards at Gremberg, Mannheim, Munich and Northern Seelze. 

45 locomotives are expected to be rebuilt to have both types of remoted control.

Future
Deutsche Bahn AG has announced that the diesel locomotives of series 291 and 295 will be replaced with Voith Gravita locomotives from 2010 onwards.

Notes

References

External links

Deutsche Bundesbahn - V 90 Introduction to the V 90 class, full class owner history details and images for MaK built locomotives. loks-aus-kiel.de (in German)
 DB Class V 90 - The diesel-hydraulic locomotive

V 090
B-B locomotives
MaK locomotives
Railway locomotives introduced in 1963
Standard gauge locomotives of Germany
Freight locomotives